The 1997 Cairns Cyclones season was the second season that the Cairns Cyclones rugby league team competed in the Channel Nine Queensland Cup. The Queensland Cup was the second tier competition under the Brisbane Rugby League. The Cyclones were one of fourteen clubs competing in the eighteen-week-long competition. Three teams had left the competition at the end of the 1996 season, the Bundaberg Grizzlies, Mackay Sea Eagles and the Sunshine Coast Falcons and one team, the Gold Coast Burleigh Bears had joined.

The Cairns Cyclones team was managed by Nigel Tillett and coached by Gary Smith.

1997 Cairns Cyclones Squad 

1. Shannon Van Balen (Fullback)
2. Richard Murgha (Threequarters)
3. Craig Cygler (Threequarters)
4. David Maiden (Threequarters)
5. Peter Dangerfield (Threequarters)
6. Paul Fowler (Halves)
7. Robbie Schmidt (captain) (Halves)
8. Scott Manns (Forwards)
9. Shane Vivian (Forwards)
10. Gavin Sant (Forwards)
11. Peter Deaves (Forwards)
12. Andy Henley (Forwards)
13. Shane Medhurst (Forwards)
14. Mick Skardon (Replacements)
15. Ben Zammataro (Replacements)
16. Nathan Woods (Replacements)
17. Nathan Butterworth (Replacements)

Other players
Fullback 1. John Clifford
Winger 2. Fabian Della Bosca
Prop 8. Andrew Bulmer
Troy Lorimer
Steven Hepworth
Scott Manns
Aaron Port
Michal Mahoney
Cian Jacobs
Boyd Lorimer
Tasman Van Balen
Stephen Tillett

1997 Channel Nine Cup

1997 Ladder

1997 Minor Premiers and Premiers

Minor Premiers:  Wynnum Manly Seagulls
Premiers:  Redcliffe Dolphins

1997 Cairns Cyclones Matches

References

Rugby league in Queensland